The Tunisian Men's Volleyball Cup began with 1956–57 season. It is organized by Tunisian Volleyball Federation. Clubs of all divisions takes part in this competition.

Titles

Performance by club

See also 
 Tunisian Women's Volleyball Cup

References

External links
Tunisian Volleyball Federation

Cup
Volleyball competitions in Tunisia